Cadillac-sur-Garonne (known as Cadillac until 31 December 2022) is a commune in the Gironde department in Nouvelle-Aquitaine in southwestern France.

History
Cadillac-sur-Garonne was founded in 1280 to serve as a river port for the castle of Benauges by the lord of the castle, Jean I de Grailly.

Name
Cadillac-sur-Garonne is attested in the form Cadilacum in 1306. Toponymist Ernest Nègre explains the name as made up of personal roman name -Catilius, with the suffix -acum.

The suffix -acum is of gauloise origins (in the form -acon). It served to localise persons or the origins of persons before it became to demark the property of some person.

Geography
Cadillac-sur-Garonne is directly across the Garonne river from Sauternes, and is known for producing sweet dessert wines under the Cadillac AOC designation.

Population

Sights
Cadillac-sur-Garonne is the home of the imposing Château des Ducs d'Épernon.

Name
The name of the commune was adopted by Antoine Laumet de La Mothe, sieur de Cadillac, the founder of Detroit and Governor of Louisiana, on his arrival to what is now the United States. The Cadillac division of General Motors, and Cadillac, Michigan are named after him.

See also
French wine
Communes of the Gironde department

References

Communes of Gironde
Monuments historiques of Gironde
Monuments of the Centre des monuments nationaux